Admiral Panteleyev is an  ("large anti-submarine ship") of the Russian Navy. She is named after Yuri Aleksandrovich Panteleyev.

History

She is a part of the Russian Pacific Ocean Fleet; she was deployed in 2009 as part of operations to combat piracy off the Somali coast. Ship also participated at RIMPAC 2012.

From October 20 to October 26, 2017, Admiral Panteleyev visited Manila along with  Admiral Vinogradov and  Boris Butoma. Admiral Panteleyev carried over 5,000 Kalashnikov AKM rifles, 5000 SSh-68 steel helmets, 20 Ural-4320 utility trucks, and over a million rounds of 7.62×39mm as part of the Russian government's assistance to the Philippines during the Battle of Marawi. President Rodrigo Duterte visited the ship alongside AFP, DFA, and Russian Embassy officials on October 25, 2017 to inspect the donated material .

In March 2022, the destroyer, accompanied by the tanker Izhora, was reported on exercises in the East China Sea.

Between 3 and 10 June 2022, Admiral Panteleyev, along with corvettes Gromkiy, Sovershennyy, Aldar Tsydenzhapov and intelligence ship Marshal Krylov, took part in naval exercises in the Pacific Ocean. More than 40 warships and support vessels, as well as around 20 aircraft, were involved in the exercises.

On 25 November 2022, she was at sea conducting anti-submarine exercises along with a diesel-electric submarine.

References

External links

 
Russians detain 29 suspected pirates

Udaloy-class destroyers
1990 ships
Ships of the Russian Navy
Destroyers of the Soviet Navy
Ships built in the Soviet Union
Ships built at Yantar Shipyard